A number of public holidays and special events take place each year in Hungary.

Fixed public holidays

Article J of the Constitution of Hungary on national holidays
(1) The national holidays of Hungary shall be:

a) the 15th day of March, in memory of the 1848–49 Revolution and War of Independence,

b) the 20th day of August, in memory of the state's founding and its founder King Saint Stephen,

c) the 23rd day of October, in memory of the 1956 Revolution and War of Independence.
 
(2) The official state holiday shall be the 20th day of August.

Source:

List of public holidays

Remembrance days endorsed by the state 
Remembrance Days are working days in Hungary.

Holidays not endorsed by the state

Special events 

Hungary's most notable annual events include the Budapest Spring Festival (mid-march to mid-April), Hortobágy Equestrian Days (late June), Sopron Early Music Days (late June), Festival in Budapest (late June), Miskolc Opera Festival (late June), Miskolc Kalálka International Folk Festival (July), Győr Summer Festival (late June), Győr Summer Cultural Festival (late June to late July), Pannon Festival in Pécs (July and August), Szentendre Summer Festival (July), Kőszeg Street Theatre Festival (late July), Savaria International Dance Competition in Szombathely (July), Debrecen Jazz Days (July), Szeged Open Air Festival (mid-July to August), Diáksziget (shorter: "Sziget" or "Sziget Festival", Student Island or Pepsi Island) north of Budapest (August), Eger Wine Harvest Festival (September), and Budapest Autumn Arts Festival (mid-September to mid-October).

St Stephen's Day (August 20) is celebrated with sporting events, parades and fireworks nationwide. On the same day there is a Floral Festival in Debrecen and a Bridge Fair in nearby Hortobágy. Formula 1 car races are held in early August at the Hungaroring near Mogyoród, 18 km northeast of Budapest.

References

External links

 Hungarian public holidays calculator

 
Hungary
Holidays